Gabby Giffords Won't Back Down is a 2022 American documentary film directed by Julie Cohen and Betsy West. It follows Gabrielle Giffords as she recovers from the 2011 shooting.

It had its world premiere at South by Southwest on March 12, 2022. It was released on July 15, 2022, by Briarcliff Entertainment.

Premise
The film follows the recovery and aftermath of the 2011 assassination attempt of congresswoman Gabrielle Giffords.  Giffords becomes partially paralyzed and has a language impairment aphasia.

Production
Initially, the film was set to follow Gabrielle Giffords as she toured the country to support her cause, but was scrapped due to the COVID-19 pandemic. Mark Kelly provided the filmmakers footage of Giffords recovery, which he shot while she was in the hospital.

In January 2022, it was announced Julie Cohen and Betsy West would direct a documentary film revolving around Gabrielle Giffords, with CNN Films and Time Studios set to produce.

Release
The film had its world premiere at South by Southwest on March 12, 2022. Shortly after, Briarcliff Entertainment acquired distribution rights to the film, and set it for a July 15, 2022, release. The film premiered on CNN on Sunday, November 20, 2022.

Reception
In the United States and Canada, the film earned $75,124 from 302 theaters in its opening weekend.

Critical response
The review aggregator website Rotten Tomatoes reported an approval rating of 100% based on 45 reviews, with an average rating of 8/10. The website's consensus reads, "Inspirational and unabashedly political, Gabby Giffords Won't Back Down pays passionate tribute to its resilient subject."

References

External links
 

2022 films
2022 documentary films
American documentary films
Documentaries about politics
CNN Films films
2020s English-language films
Films directed by Julie Cohen and Betsy West
2020s American films
Works about gun politics in the United States